George Nelson Lester (March 13, 1824 – March 30, 1892) was a Confederate politician who served in the Confederate States Congress during the American Civil War.

Lester was born in Abbeville County, South Carolina. He served in the Georgia House of Representatives and enlisted in the Confederate Army early in the Civil War. He was wounded in combat, losing an arm. He represented Georgia in the Second Confederate Congress from 1864 to 1865.

After the war he served as Georgia's Attorney General from 1890 to 1892.

References
 The Political Graveyard

Members of the Confederate House of Representatives from Georgia (U.S. state)
19th-century American politicians
Confederate States Army officers
People from Abbeville County, South Carolina
American amputees
1824 births
1892 deaths
Georgia (U.S. state) Attorneys General
American politicians with disabilities